Avaria is a genus of moths belonging to the subfamily Tortricinae of the family Tortricidae.

Species
Avaria constanti (Rebel, in Rebel & Rogenhofer, 1894)
Avaria hyerana (Millière, 1858)

See also
List of Tortricidae genera

References

 , 1981, Priamus 1: 117.
 ,2005 World Catalogue of Insects 5

External links
tortricidae.com

Archipini
Tortricidae genera